Chonburi Stadium is a multi-use stadium in Chonburi Province, Thailand. It is currently used mostly for football matches and is the home stadium of Chonburi Football Club.  The stadium holds 8,680 people.

History

The Chonburi Stadium is a multi-purpose stadium used mostly for association football games located at Suan Luang Rama IX Park in Mueang Chonburi, Chonburi, with a capacity of 8,680  seats, is currently used as the home of Chonburi Football Club. 

The stadium was used for the first time a season in 2012 for the Thai Premier League and also used to play in the AFC Cup as well as their first time in this competition. After the earlier of the playing in AFC competition, The stadium is not qualified to be used in the field so they use Supachalasai Stadium in previous years. But at end of 2012, the stadium can be used and led the team to reach the semi-finals in the 2012 AFC Cup for the club's first time in Chonburi history.

References

External links
 Stadium Profile

Chonburi F.C.
Football venues in Thailand
Sport in Chonburi province
Buildings and structures in Chonburi province
Sports venues completed in 2010
2010 establishments in Thailand